Hardt Field, also known in development as the Roadrunner Baseball Complex, is a baseball stadium in Bakersfield, California, United States.  It is the home field of the Cal State Bakersfield Roadrunners baseball team. The stadium is located in the south-west section of the campus of Cal State Bakersfield.

The stadium was named for Tom and Barbara Hardt. The Hardt Family Trust's $1 million gift and donation of general contracting work supported the construction of the on campus baseball training and playing facility.

The first game played in Hardt Field was the inaugural game for the Cal State Bakersfield baseball team on February 20, 2009, between CSUB and Saint Louis, with the Billikens beating the Roadrunners 8–7 before a sold-out crowd.  Highlights from the inaugural (2009) season included a walk-off win in the 15th inning over UC Riverside.  Also during the 2009 season, Hardt Field was the site of the first time that an NCAA Division I first-year program had defeated the reigning College World Series champion, when the Roadrunners beat Fresno State 4–3.

Prior to the start of the 2013 season, 750 chairbacked seats were added at the field.

Gallery

See also 
 List of NCAA Division I baseball venues

References

External links 
  2009 BASEBALL QUICK FACTS
  Track the Progress of CSUB's Hardt Field 

College baseball venues in the United States
Sports venues in Bakersfield, California
Cal State Bakersfield Roadrunners baseball
Sports venues completed in 2009
2009 establishments in California